NGC 5713 is a peculiar, asymmetric galaxy in the constellation Virgo. Although classified as a spiral galaxy by most galaxy catalogs, NGC 5713 is very different from most normal spiral galaxies.  While most spiral galaxies either have either two well-defined spiral arms or a filamentary spiral-like structure, this spiral galaxy has only one visible spiral arm in its disk.  This makes it a galaxy of the Magellanic type. Gravitational interactions with the nearby spiral galaxy NGC 5719 may be responsible for producing the disturbed, asymmetric structure including the single spiral arm.

NGC 5713 is at the center of a small group of spiral galaxies that also includes NGC 5691, NGC 5705, and NGC 5719. It is a member of the NGC 5746 Group of galaxies, itself one of the Virgo III Groups strung out to the east of the Virgo Supercluster of galaxies.

Star formation

Compared to many other nearby spiral galaxies, NGC 5713 appears to be a site of relatively intense star formation activity.  The boost in star formation in NGC 5713 may be linked to the gravitational interactions with NGC 5719.  The interactions are expected to disturb the orbits of gas clouds in NGC 5713, thus causing the clouds to collide with each other.  The collisions cause the clouds to collapse and form new stars, hence leading to the increased star formation seen in NGC 5713.

See also 
 NGC 4618, an interacting galaxy with a similar morphology
 NGC 4625, an interacting galaxy with a similar morphology

References

External links 
 

Unbarred spiral galaxies
Peculiar galaxies
Virgo (constellation)
5713
09451
52412
Interacting galaxies